Huai Sai is a tambon (subdistrict) of Mae Rim District, in Chiang Mai Province, Thailand. In 2020 it had a total population of 4,789 people.

Administration

Central administration
The tambon is subdivided into 5 administrative villages (muban).

Local administration
The whole area of the subdistrict is covered by the subdistrict administrative organization (SAO) Huai Sai (องค์การบริหารส่วนตำบลห้วยทราย).

References

External links
Thaitambon.com on Huai Sai

Tambon of Chiang Mai province
Populated places in Chiang Mai province